Eggert House is located 1½ miles west of the abandoned Franklin townsite in Douglas County, Kansas.  Franklin was east of Lawrence, Kansas.  Originally the house was a log hut that the Johan H. Eggert family moved into in 1856.  At the time pro-southern partisans raided the area, taking items from area settlers, including the Eggert family.

Although the area became peaceful by 1857, in that year the Eggerts built a two-story limestone farmhouse, outfitted so it could be defended against attackers.  Gun-loops were built into the first floor walls to enable the occupants to defend themselves against attack.  It is unknown whether the house was manned by armed men, although William C. Quantrill and 400 Confederate guerrillas and army recruits passed within a half mile of the Eggert house August 21, 1863, on their way to raid Lawrence, Kansas.

The Eggert house still stands and is still occupied, having been well maintained through the intervening years.

References

Forts in Kansas
Houses in Douglas County, Kansas
1856 establishments in Kansas Territory